Caloptilia pastranai is a moth of the family Gracillariidae. It is known from Argentina.

The larvae feed on Scutia buxifolia. The larvae feed in enrolled leaves. They often changed to a new leaf.

References

pastranai
Moths of South America
Moths described in 1962